Alan Bennett is an English playwright.

Having started at the Royal National Theatre, he became known for such works as Talking Heads, The Madness of King George, The History Boys, The Lady in the Van and The Habit of Art. The following plays were later adapted into films, The Madness of King George (1995), The History Boys (2005), and The Lady in the Van (2015).

Television

Theatre

Film

Radio

Books

Audio releases

References